Navami is the Sanskrit word for "ninth", and is the ninth day in the lunar fortnight (Paksha) of the Hindu calendar. Each month has two Navami days, being the ninth day of the "bright" (Shukla) and of the "dark" (Krishna) fortnights respectively. Navami occurs on the ninth and the twenty-fourth day of each month.

Festivals
 Rama Navami is a Hindu festival, celebrating of the birth of the deity Rama. It is celebrated on the Navami of Shukla Paksha of the Chaitra month.
 Sita Navami is a Hindu festival, celebrating the birth of the goddess Sita. It is celebrated on Navami of the Shukla Paksha of the Vaishakha month.
 Swaminarayan Jayanti is a Hindu festival celebrating the birth of Swaminarayan. It is celebrated in Chaitra month on the ninth day which actually falls onto Rama Navami.
 Maha Navami (Great Ninth Day) is part of Navaratri celebrations. Sharad Navaratri is the most important of the Navaratris, and is celebrated during Sharad Ritu. Ayudha Puja or Astra Puja is an integral part of the Vijayadashami festival, a Hindu festival which is traditionally celebrated in India.

The Hindu saint Sri Guru Raghavendra Swami was born on Phalguna Shukla Navami, when the moon was in Mrigashīrsha Nakshatra, in 1595 CE and advocated Madhvacharya's Dvaita philosophy.

References

Hindu calendar
09